The 2010 SaskTel Tankard was held February 10–14 at the Lumsden Sports Centre in Lumsden, Saskatchewan.

Saskatoon's Darrell McKee won his third provincial title, defeating Moose Jaw's Joel Jordison 7-5 in the final.

Teams

Draw

A Event

B Event

C Event

Playoffs

Final

External links 
 Official site

SaskTel Tankard